Grated Coconut #G-65 (born 1997) is a Canadian former rodeo bucking horse that was specialized in bareback bronc riding. He was a six-time Professional Rodeo Cowboys Association (PRCA) Bareback Horse of the Year (2003, 2004, 2006, 2007, 2008, and 2009). He was also a six-time Canadian Professional Rodeo Association (CPRA) Bareback Horse of the Year from (2003, 2004, 2005, 2007, 2008, and 2009). He has been inducted into three halls of fame, including the ProRodeo Hall of Fame of the PRCA, the Canadian Pro Rodeo Hall of Fame of the CPRA, and the Ellensburg Rodeo Hall of Fame of the PRCA-sanctioned Ellensburg Rodeo.

Early life
Grated Coconut was born in 1997 on the Calgary Stampede Ranch. He is a dark bay stallion with a white blaze and two white stockings on his back feet. Grated Coconut came out of the Born to Buck Breeding Program at the Ranch in Hanna, Alberta. He was sired by Wyatt Earp of Northcott Road and was out of Coconut Roll. His sire, Wyatt Earp, was voted Saddle Bronc Horse of the PRCA's National Finals Rodeo  (NFR) in 1997 and 1998. His mother, Coconut Roll, qualified for the NFR ten times. His sire was also a Canadian Pro Rodeo Hall of Fame inductee in 2010.

Career
Davey Shields Jr. scored 95 points on the stallion and won $50,000 at the Calgary Stampede in Calgary, Alberta in 2005. In early 2008, Dusty LaValley was 91 points on him at the National Western Stock Show in Denver, Colorado. Later that same year, Steven Dent set an arena record at the Caldwell Night Rodeo in Caldwell, Idaho with a 91-point ride on Grated Coconut.

Summary
Grated Coconut had 114 outs in his career. He bucked off 37 cowboys. He was ridden by 25 cowboys. Another 29 cowboys rode him to finish in the money. Cowboys most often won some money if they could stay aboard him for eight seconds. Coconut's abilities in the arena earned him six PRCA Bareback Horse of the Year titles from 2003 to 2004, and from 2006 to 2009. The six titles tied him another great bucking horse, Descent. He also earned six CPRA Bareback Horse of the Year titles from 2003 to 2005, and from 2007 to 2009.

Awards and honors 
 6-time PRCA Bareback Horse of the Year (2003, 2004, 2006, 2007, 2008, 2009)
 6-time CPRA Bareback Horse of the Year (2003, 2004, 2005, 2007, 2008, 2009)
 5-time Bareback Horse of the Canadian Finals Rodeo (CFR) (2004, 2005, 2007, 2008, 2009)
 2008 Bareback Horse of the NFR
 2012 Canadian Pro Rodeo Hall of Fame
 2013 Ellensburg Rodeo Hall of Fame
 2020 ProRodeo Hall of Fame

Retirement

The Calgary Stampede Ranch retired Grated Coconut in 2010, while he was still in prime shape. They bred him, and as many as 45 of his progeny are competing at the highest level of rodeo with several qualifying for the NFR and CFR. Although this horse was known to make many cowboys fearful, he was actually gentle when not in the arena,  accepting scratching and toddlers on his back. He served as the highest level of animal ambassador. Visitors interacted with him prior to him going to perform in the arena. Thus, these sides of him are what made him a great athlete.

Pedigree

References

Bibliography

External links
 ProRodeo Hall of Fame
 Professional Rodeo Cowboys Association
 Canadian Pro Rodeo Hall of Fame
 2020 ProRodeo Hall of Fame Inductee G-65 Grated Coconut (video on YouTube)

1997 animal births
Horses in the United States
Rodeo horses
ProRodeo Hall of Fame inductees
Canadian Pro Rodeo Hall of Fame inductees